The 1973 Commercial Union Assurance Grand Prix was a tennis circuit administered by the International Lawn Tennis Federation (ILTF) which served as a forerunner to the current Association of Tennis Professionals (ATP) World Tour and the Women's Tennis Association (WTA) Tour. The circuit consisted of the four modern Grand Slam tournaments and open tournaments recognised by the ILTF. This article covers all tournaments that were part of that year's Men's Grand Prix. Bonus points were awarded to players who were nominated to play in certain 1973 Davis Cup ties and who miss tournaments through competing in those ties. The Commercial Union Assurance Masters is included in this calendar but did not count towards the Grand Prix.

Schedule 

Key

December 1972

May

June

July

August

September

October

November

December

Grand Prix points system 
The tournaments listed above were divided into four groups. Group AA consisted of the Triple Crown – the French Open, the Wimbledon Championships and the US Open – while the other tournaments were divided into Groups A, B and C by prize money and draw size. Points were allocated based on these groups and the finishing position of a player in a tournament. No points were awarded to first round losers and ties were settled by the number of tournaments played. The points allocation is listed below:

Grand Prix rankings 
1) Ilie Nastase 610 points, 2) John Newcombe 512.5 points, 3) Tom Okker 498 points, 4) Jimmy Connors 383 points, 5) Manuel Orantes 358.5 points, 6) Jan Kodes 315 points, 7) Stan Smith 274 points, 8) Tom Gorman 270 points, 9) Björn Borg 240 points, 10) Arthur Ashe 236 points, 11) Rod Laver 230 points, 12) Nikki Pilic 210 points, 13) Jaime Fillol 203 points, 14) Raul Ramirez 186.5 points, 15) Onny Parun 177 points, 16) Vijay Amritraj 169.5 points, 17) Ken Rosewall 169 points, 18) Eddie Dibbs 155 points, 19) Karl Meiler 155 points, 20) Marty Riessen 141 points, 21) Alex Metreveli 141 points, 22) Jiri Hrebec 131 points, 23) Ross Case 126 points, 24) Roger Taylor 126 points, 25) Guillermo Vilas 121 points, 26) Adriano Panatta 119 points, 27) Brian Gottfried 118 points, 28) Mark Cox 118 points, 29) Jurgen Fassbender 115 points, 30) Charles Pasarell 112 points, 31) Cliff Drysdale 112 points, 32) Paolo Bertolucci 104 points, 33) Geoff Masters 100 points, 34) Ray Moore 98 points, 35) John Alexander 98 points

ATP rankings 
On 23 August 1973 the Association of Tennis Professionals published its first list of computer rankings, using points averages rather than points totals in their calculations. These are the ATP rankings of the top twenty singles players in the first list and at the end of the 1973 season, with numbers of ranking points, points averages, numbers of tournaments played, year-end rankings in 1973, highest and lowest positions during the season and number of spots gained or lost from the first rankings to the year-end rankings.

See also 
 1973 World Championship Tennis circuit
 1973 WTA Tour
 1973 USLTA Indoor Circuit

Notes

References

External links 
 ATP Archive 1973: Commercial Union Grand Prix tournaments
 History Mens Professional Tours

Further reading 
 

 
Men's Grand Prix
Grand Prix tennis circuit seasons